Francis Cox may refer to:

 Francis Augustus Cox (1783–1853), English Baptist minister
 Francis Thomas Cox (1920–2007), of the Cox Twins, British entertainers
 F. W. Cox (Francis William Cox, 1817–1904), pastor in Adelaide, South Australia